Vasil Dobrev (born 24 September 1947) is a Bulgarian former butterfly swimmer. He competed in two events at the 1972 Summer Olympics.

References

External links
 

1947 births
Living people
Bulgarian male butterfly swimmers
Olympic swimmers of Bulgaria
Swimmers at the 1972 Summer Olympics
Sportspeople from Sofia